Dongnae station is a railway station of the Donghae Line in Nangmin-dong, Dongnae District, Busan, South Korea. The station is unrelated to the Dongnae Station of Busan Metro.

Station layout

References

Dongnae District
Korail stations
Railway stations in Busan
Railway stations opened in 1934
1934 establishments in Korea